The Jesuit Relations, also known as Relations des Jésuites de la Nouvelle-France, are chronicles of the Jesuit missions in New France. The works were written annually and printed beginning in 1632 and ending in 1673.

Originally written in French, Latin, and Italian, The Jesuit Relations were reports from Jesuit missionaries in the field to their superiors to update them as to the missionaries' progress in the conversion of various Indigenous North American tribes, including the Huron, Montagnais, Mi ' kmaq, Mohawk, and Algonquins. Constructed as narratives, the original reports of the Jesuit missionaries were subsequently transcribed and altered several times before their publication, first by the Jesuit overseer in New France and then by the Jesuit governing body in France. The Jesuits began to shape the Relations for the general public, in order to attract new settlers to the colony and to raise enough capital to continue the missions in New France. Overall, these texts serve as microcosms of Indigenous-European relations in North America.

Recent scholarship illuminates how these documents may have been re-circulated back to Jesuit colleges in New France, which changes how one can understand their ethnographic and knowledge-producing value.

History
Jesuit missionaries had to write annual reports to their superior in Québec or Montréal as an account of their activities. Annually, between 1632 and 1673, the superior compiled a narrative or "Relation" of the most important events which had occurred in the several missionary districts under his charge, sometimes using the exact words of the missionaries and sometimes summarizing the individual journals in a general account, based in part also upon the oral reports of visiting fathers. This annual "Relation" was forwarded to the provincial of the Order in France. After he reviewed and edited it, he published the account in a series of duodecimo volumes, known collectively as The Jesuit Relations.

Missionary Charles Lallemont wrote a letter to his brother, dated 1 August 1626, which marks the beginning of the fathers' accounts and the series Relations des Jésuites de la Nouvelle-France about the missionary work in New France. It is believed that Louis de Buade de Frontenac, who disliked the Jesuit order, strongly influenced ending this publication.

Criticism
As the Jesuit order used The Jesuit Relations to help raise money for the missions, scholars have scrutinized the reports for the possibility of textual incongruity or fictionalized accounts. Certainly the Jesuits may have worked to convey optimism about their progress in converting the Indigenous peoples, as it was very slow. There are also numerous examples of Jesuits' bias against Indigenous peoples within these texts, as well as deliberate attempts to interpret Indigenous customs through a European lens.

When examined critically, The Jesuit Relations can function as an important resource in the study of cultural exchange that occurred between the settlers of New France and Native Americans, because many of these missionaries attempted to immerse themselves within Indigenous societies and understand their cultures and practices to a greater extent than other European settlers.

Because of the wide distribution of the letters after publication, scholars ask the question: who decided the relevance of information contained in these field letters?  Although the Jesuits tried to avoid disclosing any compromise in their principles, "it is possible to detect evidence of soul searching and shifting points of view" relative to their success at converting Indigenous peoples. After extensive cultural immersion, some missionaries may have adopted certain Indigenous ways of life or cultural practices. Jesuit officials in France would be liable to omit any threat to their philosophies in the final document. The issue concerns less the basic accuracy of the Jesuit Relations than the "manipulative literary devices" employed by the editors. Prominent Jesuit Relations scholar Allan Greer notes that European writings were popularly documented in one of two forms, as travel narratives or as encyclopedic catalogs. He notes that the Jesuits obscured the boundaries between these two genres in an attempt to raise funds to continue Jesuit missions in New France: "One of the peculiarities of the Jesuit Relations is that they combine both types of writing: Jacques Marquette's personal narrative of his trip down the Mississippi, for example, shares space with Jean de Brébeuf's systematic description of Huron society."

Content

Anthropology from a Jesuit Perspective 
Given the Jesuits' objectives, "A few graphic accounts of persecution could be more effective fund-raisers than uninterrupted tales of triumph. Ironically, therefore, Jesuit preconceptions about the difficulty of their chore produced a more balanced record of their successes and failures than might be expected.”

Because these texts were used to raise revenue for the Jesuit cause, they may demonstrate exaggerations of the progress in converting Indigenous peoples as well as dramatized accounts of encounters. Additionally, the Jesuits often wrote about the fighting that took place between Indigenous tribes from a perspective of horror, despite the consistent warring in Europe at the time.

The Jesuit missionaries believed that, through developing an in-depth understanding of Indigenous cultures, they could convert more people. One prominent example, Jean de Brébeuf, was known for his attempts to immerse himself in the language, culture, and religious customs of the Huron peoples. Specifically, in an entry titled "What the Hurons Think about Their Origin," Brébeuf explained to the audience a Huron creation story, seeking allusions to the Biblical creation story in this description.

Paul Le Jeune also described some customs of the Huron, such as hunting and fishing practices. Le Jeune attempted to explain the spiritual context for certain hunting practices, such as explanations for how and why the Iroquois had specific rituals for hunting beaver. In his text, Le Jeune expresses skepticism for these traditions' validity.

Martyrdom 

Another important theme in these texts is that of martyrdom. The relations included descriptions of Jesuit missionaries being killed or maimed, for example, the death of Isaac Jogues, who died after being captured by the Mohawk in 1646. There is also a graphic description of Brébeuf's death in 1649. The text describes the self-mortification of Kateri Tekakwitha, an Algonquin-Mohawk woman who converted to Catholicism and lived in a Jesuit mission in Sault Saint-Louis. A Relation detailing her story was published in 1744. These descriptions of martyrdom were likely used to continue to justify the Jesuits' attempts to convert Indigenous peoples, and could have been exaggerated for this reason. Even when very few people converted to Catholicism in a given year, the Jesuits would still use these examples as proof that some people were extremely dedicated to their missions, and that their efforts were worthy of continuation.

Nature 
The Jesuit Relations also provide evidence for early European settlers' attitudes toward nature and Eurocentric bias in terms of how they believed this land should be used. These missionaries by and large did not view nature as peaceful or a place to cultivate spiritual practice. Rather, they believed that the woods needed to be turned into European-style settlements and agricultural fields. Throughout the Relations, there are many accounts of missionaries being afraid of or intimidated by the woods, for example, Le Jeune's description of a journey through the woods with a band of Montagnais people, Journal of a Winter Hunt, published in 1634. Le Jeune details physical hardships of carrying a great deal of belongings in the cold, with little food. Le Jeune largely blamed the Indigenous people for not having fully developed the land for his hardships.

While the soil in New France as good for farming, it was "interpreted as unused and barren," because it hadn't yet been developed.
The Jesuits' conceptualization of nature is important in understanding the making of race and racialization in North America, and to overall understand how Europeans invented the false concept of biological race. Initially, the Jesuits did not attribute differences between themselves and the Indigenous peoples they met to biology. Instead, they believed that the environments different groups of people lived in explained why different peoples had different customs, culture, social norms, etc. Overall, Jesuits' conceptualizations of nature, “Provided Jesuits with both a justification for mission work and a racial theory for Europeanization.”

Compilation and modern publication
Jesuit Relations were publicized as field letters from the missionary priests, reports of eyewitness, and testimony. The process of passage up the hierarchy meant that accounts would be summarized and shaped according to each man's view. The editing journey "began with detailed letters from priests in the field, the most important usually being the one brought down by the summer canoe brigade from the Huron Country. The superior at Quebec would compile and edit these letters, paraphrasing some parts, copying others verbatim, and forwarding the whole package to France." The Jesuit Society in France approved any documents that they published and they likely altered some material before printing. Likewise, John Pollack notes the account of Father Isaac Jogues in 1641 "is not an eyewitness testimony" but, rather, a second-hand relation by his superior, "drawn from Jogues' letters." Pollack notes further that the Relations "were edited by Jesuit missions in Paris before publication."

What are generally known as the Relations proper, addressed to the superior and published in Paris under direction of the provincial, commence with Le Jeune's Brieve Relations du Voyage de la Noevelle-France (1632). Thereafter a duodecimo volume, neatly printed and bound in vellum, was issued annually from the press of Sebastien Cramoisy in Paris until 1673. Several similar texts that were published prior to 1632 are sometimes considered part of the corpus.

No single unified edition existed until Reuben Gold Thwaites, secretary of the Wisconsin Historical Society, led the project to translate into English, unify, and cross-reference the numerous original Relations. Between 1896 and 1901 Thwaites and his associates compiled 73 volumes, including two volumes of indices. The Relations effectively comprise a large body of ethnographic material. He included many other papers, rare manuscripts, and letters from the archives of the Society of Jesus, spanning a period from the founding of the order to 1791.

The indices are comprehensive in scope and include titles such as: Marriage and Marriage Customs, Courtship, Divorce, Social Status of Women, Songs and Singing, Dances, and Games and Recreation.  Much can be learned through the examination and study of the ethnographic material compiled by the Jesuit missionaries in New France. The depth of the cross-referencing allows for several hundred years of Native American/European interaction to be easily accessed.

While Thwaites is the first and arguably the best known of modern editions, others followed. Lucien Campeau SJ (1967–2003) discussed the texts which he included as well as the historical events they refer to; his work is considered to give the most detailed and exhaustive general overviews available.

Indigenous resistance and reaction to the Jesuits 
Some Indigenous peoples outwardly converted to Catholicism while still adhering to their traditional religion. When Jesuits attempted to force some Indigenous people into permanent settlements, believing that this would make large-scale conversion easiest, many people simply refused, or left these settlements. Furthermore, many Indigenous leaders deduced very quickly that Christianization was not the Jesuits' only intended outcome, and that this Christianization came alongside land theft and other attempts at Europeanization.

A Huron religious leader in the 1640s made a speech condemning Jesuit missionaries' plans to develop the land and noting how the Jesuit missionaries' presence resulted in higher mortality rates for the Huron. “Such powerful attacks on Christianity and its effects on traditional ways of life were repeated constantly by native priests throughout New France. Their potent arguments frequently thwarted Jesuit efforts.”

Tekakwitha's canonization, which took place in 2012, is controversial because some Indigenous people in North America believe that the Catholic Church needs to do more to account for the harms committed in its colonial past, and believe that this canonization could gloss over this history. Others believe that Tekakwitha's canonization was a long-overdue honor.

Context within France 
These Relations were written during the Counter-Reformation in Europe, during which Catholicism gained popularity and the Church reformed itself. The Jesuits grew in power during this period, even achieving influence within Louis XIV's court. This garnered suspicion and rivalry from other religious sects. This rivalry could potentially be a factor that propelled the Jesuits to carefully select the information they included in the Relations.

Le Jeune wrote in the Relations his ideas of how the land in New France should be used; natural resources New France could offer France, and possibility of increased employment of Frenchmen in New France. Le Jeune also wrote in the Relations about the poverty of Indigenous people, comparing them to France's poor. This was largely to further convince French government of the urgency of colonizing and to justify colonization as bringing wealth to Indigenous people, rather than an inherently violent process. In fact, it is made clear that a main goal of these Relations was to further not only Jesuit religious interests, but French economic interests.

Representation in other media
The Canadian drama film Mission of Fear (1965) is based substantially on The Jesuit Relations.

See also
 (1703–1776)

Notes

Bibliography
 
 Relations des jésuites: contenant ce qui s'est passé de plus remarquables dans les missions des pères de la Compagnie de Jésus dans la Nouvelle-France.Quebec: A. Côté, 1858.
 
 Deslandres, Dominique. 'Exemplo aeque et verbo: The French Jesuits' Missionary World.' In The Jesuits: Cultures, Sciences and the Arts, 1540-1773. Ed. John W. O'Malley and others. Toronto:University of Toronto Press, 2000.
 Donnely, Joseph P. Thwaites' Jesuit Relations: Errata and Addenda. Chicago: Loyola University Press, 1967.
 
 
 
 
McCoy, James C. Jesuit relations of Canada, 1632-1673: A Bibliography. Paris: A. Rau, 1937.
 
 
 
 
Pollack, John. The Heath Anthology of American Literature. Houghton Mifflin. Boston, United States. 2009. 243.

Further reading
 
 
Deslandres, Dominique, Croire et Faire Croire: Les Missions Francaises au XVIIe siecle (1600-1650). Paris: Fayard, 2003.
Moore, James T., Indian and Jesuit: A Seventeenth-century Encounter. Chicago: Loyola University Press, 1982.
Morrison, Kenneth, The Solidarity of Kin: Ethnohistory, Religious Studies, and the Algonkian-French Encounter. Albany: State University of New York Press, 2002.

External links
 Text of The Jesuit Relations in English, Creighton University
 [http://www.collectionscanada.ca/jesuit-relations/index-e.html A general overview of the Relations'''], Library and Archives Canada
 "Publishing and distribution history of the Relations", Library and Archives Canada
 
 The Jesuit Relations and Allied Documents at Project Gutenberg
 Relations des Jésuites contenant ce qui s'est passé de plus remarquable dans les missions des Pères de la Compagnie de Jésus dans la Nouvelle-France'' (1858) text in French at the Internet Archive
 Volume I, Covering the years 1611 and 1626 and the period from 1632 to 1641.
 Volume II, Covering the years from 1642 to 1655. 
 Volume III, Covering the years from 1656 to 1672.

Jesuit publications
New France
French-language literature in Canada
Non-fiction books adapted into films